Júlio César de Paula Muniz, Jr., known as Júlio César or sometimes Juninho (born 4 January 1988), is a Brazilian footballer who plays for São José.

Biography
Born in Itaguaí, in the state of Rio de Janeiro, Júlio César started his professional career at Grêmio. He signed a contract in October 2007 and extended to 31 December 2009 in December 2008. He played a few games in 2009 Campeonato Gaúcho.

In January 2010 he was signed by Artsul in 1-year contract. On 1 February he returned to Rio Grande do Sul state for Juventude, where he met his namesake Júlio César Zabotto. He played twice in both 2010 Campeonato Gaúcho and 2010 Copa do Brasil before Zabotto formally available on 25 February. Both players did not play any game since March 2010. However his contract was extended until the end of 2010 Campeonato Brasileiro Série C in May. He was released after the team failed to advance to stage two.

In January 2011 he left for Guaratinguetá (at that time the club relocated to Americana) in 3-year contract. However, in the first half of the season, his namesake, centre-back Júlio César Coimbra was a regular starter. He played the last 4 matches of 2011 Campeonato Paulista, which J.César Coimbra did not play.

In May J.César Coimbra left the club but in July the club signed Júlio César Zabotto. He played 12 out of first 15 matches of the second division, but only collected 3 appearances in the second half of the league (also after the arrival of the namesake), on 30 August, on 27 September. and on 26 November (last round). He was substituted by Gercimar in the first half on 6 August, his 12th appearance, again first match when Zabotto became available.

In January 2019, César joined São José.

References

External links
 Profile at Grêmio 
 

1988 births
Living people
Brazilian footballers
Grêmio Foot-Ball Porto Alegrense players
Esporte Clube Juventude players
Guaratinguetá Futebol players
Avaí FC players
Capivariano Futebol Clube players
Atlético Clube de Portugal players
Hapoel Haifa F.C. players
Hapoel Katamon Jerusalem F.C. players
FC Cascavel players
Esporte Clube São José players
Association football midfielders
Sportspeople from Rio de Janeiro (state)
Expatriate footballers in Portugal
Expatriate footballers in Israel
Brazilian expatriates in Portugal
Brazilian expatriates in Israel
Israeli Premier League players
Liga Leumit players
People from Itaguaí